The Sun Fast 26 is a French sailboat that was designed by Philippe Briand and the Jeanneau Design Office as a cruiser-racer and first built in 1998.

The Sun Fast 26 is part of the Sun Fast sailboat range.

Production
The design was built by Jeanneau in France, from 1998 to 2003, but it is now out of production.

Design
The Sun Fast 26 is a recreational keelboat, built predominantly of polyester fiberglass, with wood trim. It has a fractional sloop rig, with a deck-stepped mast, a single set of swept spreaders and aluminum spars with continuous stainless steel wire rigging. The hull has a plumb stem, a reverse transom with a swimming platform, twin spade-type rudders controlled by a tiller and a fixed fin keel, with a weighted bulb. It displaces  and carries  of cast iron ballast.

The design has sleeping accommodation for four people, with a double "V"-berth in the bow cabin around a table and an aft cabin with a centered double berth. The galley is located on the starboard side just forward of the companionway ladder. The galley is "L"-shaped and is equipped with a two-burner stove, an ice box and a sink. The head is located aft on the port side.

Operational history
The boat was at one time supported by a class club that organized racing events, the Sun Fast Association.

See also
List of sailing boat types

References

External links

Keelboats
1990s sailboat type designs
Sailing yachts
Sailboat type designs by Philippe Briand
Sailboat type designs by Jeanneau Design Office
Sailboat types built by Jeanneau